Crystal Lynn Bernard (born September 30, 1961) is an American singer-songwriter and actress, best known for her roles as Helen Chappel-Hackett on the sitcom Wings (1990-1997), Amy on It's a Living (1985–1989), and K.C. Cunningham on Happy Days (1983–1984).

Early life
Bernard was born in Garland, Texas, to Southern Baptists. Her father, the televangelist Jerry Wayne Bernard, traveled across the United States preaching and singing. Her mother, Gaylon (née Fussell) Bernard, was a teacher, though in the 1980s she became an artist and sculptor. Bernard became an entertainer at a young age, singing gospel songs with her older sister, Robyn, also an actress. One recording of the two that has survived from those years is a song called "The Monkey Song", on Feudin' Fussin' and Frettin' , recorded when Crystal was eight years old, a recording of a 1972 Thomas Road Baptist Church service led by Jerry Falwell. She has two younger sisters, Scarlett and Angelique Bernard.

Bernard studied acting at Alley Theatre while growing up in Houston, Texas. She attended Spring High School and continued her education at Baylor University,  studying acting and international relations.

Career

Television

Bernard got her start in prime time television on the sitcom Happy Days, playing K.C. Cunningham during season 10 (1982–83). Then, after various guest appearances on other series, she joined the cast of the resurrected, syndicated version of the sitcom It's a Living, playing waitress Amy Tompkins. In 1989, she starred in a television pilot, Chameleons, created by Glen A. Larson. She played Shelley, a self-proclaimed crazed heiress who discovers that her eccentric millionaire uncle Jason Carr has been murdered. She sets out on a quest to find the truth behind his murder.

She played strong-willed airport lunch-counter operator and cellist Helen Chappel Hackett on the sitcom Wings for the series' entire eight-season duration (1990–97). In 1999, she starred in the television movie To Love, Honor and Betray opposite David Cubitt and James Brolin.

Film
Early in her film career, she appeared in Young Doctors in Love (1982), along with her Happy Days co-star Ted McGinley. She starred in Deborah Brock's Roger Corman-produced horror film Slumber Party Massacre 2 (1987).
Later, her work included a role in the film Jackpot (2001) and starring roles in Welcome to Paradise (2007) and Grave Misconduct (2008). She also starred in two Hallmark Channel movies, Single Santa Seeks Mrs. Claus (2004) and its sequel, Meet the Santas (2005).

Theatre
Bernard has appeared in these stage productions since the end of Wings:
 1999: a Los Angeles production of Crimes of the Heart
 2001: a 1999 Marquis Theatre revival of Annie Get Your Gun wherein she was the last in a series of actresses to play Annie Oakley
 2005: West Coast premiere of Barbra's Wedding, starring opposite Daniel Stern (who also wrote the play) at the Falcon Theatre in Burbank, California

Music
In addition to acting, Bernard has a music career as a singer-songwriter. Albums include The Girl Next Door (1996) and Don't Touch Me There (1999). The latter includes a gospel track she recorded with her father and one sung with country artist Billy Dean.  The single "Don't Touch Me There" peaked at No. 25 on the Billboard Adult Contemporary chart.

She co-wrote the song "If I Were Your Girl" with Rhett Lawrence, which appeared on Paula Abdul's album Head over Heels (1995).

Bernard sang a duet with Peter Cetera called "(I Wanna Take) Forever Tonight", released on Cetera's album One Clear Voice (1995).  The single peaked at No. 22 on the Billboard Adult Contemporary chart and No. 86 on the Hot 100.

She sang a duet with Jim Messina called "Watching the River Run".

She appeared in the video for "Birdhouse in Your Soul" by They Might Be Giants.

Filmography

Discography

Albums

Singles

Music videos

References

External links

 
 
 
 

1961 births
Living people
Actresses from Texas
American country singer-songwriters
American women country singers
American television actresses
Baylor University alumni
Country musicians from Texas
People from Garland, Texas
Singer-songwriters from Texas
20th-century American actresses
20th-century American singers
21st-century American actresses
20th-century American women singers